The MV Cape Race was originally built as the MV Seaspeed America for the Transocean RO-RO Corp. She was sold to various other corporations until she was purchased by the United States Navy in April 1993. She underwent conversion to fit a more active role in and serve a military need better and was placed back in service April 1993. She has served on multiple occasions but is currently in the US Ready Reserve Fleet.

References

External links
Ship's Official site page, Military Sealift Command
Wikimapia site

Ships built in Kittery, Maine
1977 ships